Warren Robbins may refer to:
 Warren Delano Robbins (1885–1935), American diplomat
 Warren M. Robbins (1923–2008), American Foreign Service officer and founder of the National Museum of African Art

See also 
 Warner Robins, Georgia, a city in the United States